Argentina competed at the 2020 Winter Youth Olympics in Lausanne, Switzerland from 9 to 22 January 2020. Argentina competed with 16 athletes in 4 sports.

Alpine skiing

Boys

Girls

Mixed

Cross-country skiing 

Boys

Girls

Ice hockey

Mixed 3x3 tournament 

Boys
Ruben Esposito

Girls
Delfina Fattore
Mila Lutteral

Snowboarding

Snowboard cross

Halfpipe, Slopestyle, & Big Air

See also

Argentina at the 2020 Summer Olympics

References

2020 in Argentine sport
Nations at the 2020 Winter Youth Olympics
Argentina at the Youth Olympics